East County is a region of San Diego County, California, east of San Diego.

Geography
East County does not have an official geographic definition, although East County boundaries are unofficially drawn by the County of San Diego for its second district. It commonly includes El Cajon, La Mesa, Lemon Grove and Santee, as well as suburban and rural unincorporated communities such as Lakeside, Spring Valley, Jamul, and Alpine. Many sources also include vast swaths of the backcountry of San Diego County also known as the Mountain Empire, including communities along Interstate 8 such as Pine Valley and Descanso, and communities along the rural section of California State Route 94 such as Potrero, Boulevard, and Jacumba. Other sources consider communities within the entire eastern two-thirds of the county to be East County, thereby encompassing places like Ramona, Julian, and Borrego Springs,  The Ramona area—Ramona, San Diego Country Estates and Barona Mesa—is often considered part of inland North County due to its association with Rancho Bernardo, Escondido and other North County Inland communities.

The populace of East County primarily dwells in the interior valleys east of San Diego proper while some development encroaches on the coastal foothills.

A broader definition of East County exists that includes the Cuyamaca Mountains and the Laguna Mountains, as well as the desert area of Anza-Borrego State Park. Yet, this definition, when used by SANDAG, excludes the East Suburban centers.

Prominent geologic formations include El Cajon Mountain, a large, dome-shaped mountain overlooking Santee and Lakeside, as well as Iron Mountain and Mount Woodson that overlook Poway.

Demographics
East County is the fourth most populous region in the San Diego metropolitan area, though its population is close to that of South Bay.

Populated places
Populations listed are from the 2020 census:

Incorporated cities
 El Cajon – 106,215
 La Mesa – 61,121
 Santee – 60,037
 Lemon Grove – 27,627

Census-designated places
 La Presa – 35,033
 Spring Valley – 30,998
 Winter Gardens – 22,380
 Rancho San Diego – 21,858
 Lakeside – 21,152
 Casa de Oro-Mount Helix - 19,576
 Alpine – 14,696
 Jamul – 6,179
 Eucalyptus Hills – 5,517
 Harbison Canyon – 4,048
 Granite Hills – 3,267
 Crest – 2,828

Other unincorporated communities
 Dehesa
 Flinn Springs

Former communities
 Foster

Education

Primary and secondary schools
East County is served by Santee School District, Grossmont Union High School District, Cajon Valley Union School District, Lakeside Union School District, Lemon Grove School District, Poway Unified School District.

Higher education
Grossmont College, located in El Cajon, and Cuyamaca College, located in Rancho San Diego, are two community colleges in the East County region. San Diego Christian College is located in Santee. Berean Bible College is located in Poway.

Landmarks
Important landmarks in East County included El Capitan, Mt. Helix, Santee Lakes, Sweetwater Reservoir, Poway's Tony Gwynn Statue, Lake Poway, and Lake Cuyamaca.

See also
 South Bay
 North County
 Mountain Empire

References

External links

 

.
Regions of California
.
.
.
.
.